Guanosine diphosphate mannose or GDP-mannose is a nucleotide sugar that is a substrate for glycosyltransferase reactions in metabolism. This compound is a substrate for enzymes called mannosyltransferases.

Known as donor of activated mannose in all glycolytic reactions, GDP-mannose is essential in eukaryotes.

Biosynthesis
GDP-mannose is produced from GTP and mannose-6-phosphate by the enzyme mannose-1-phosphate guanylyltransferase.

One of the enzymes from the family of nucleootidyl-transferases, GDP-Mannose Pyrophosphorylase (GDP-MP) is an pervasive enzyme found in bacteria, fungi, plants, and animals.

References

See also 

 Nucleoside
 Nucleotide
 Guanosine
 Guanosine diphosphate

Nucleotides
Coenzymes